Ethmoidal foramen may refer to:

 Anterior ethmoidal foramen
 Posterior ethmoidal foramen